Ghousia College of Engineering is an engineering college located in Ramanagaram in the southern Indian state of Karnataka. It is managed by the Ghousia Industrial and Engineering Trust, Bangalore.

Ghousia Industrial & Engineering Trust, (GIET) was started during the year 1962.

The Ghousia Industrial & Engineering Trust established the “Ghousia College of Engineering” in the year 1980 at Ramanagaram, a town which is 45 km away from Bangalore on the Bangalore-Mysore highway.

Ghousia Industrial Training Center, (GITC)

The trust started the Ghousia I.T. in the same year to train craftsman in trades of Fitter, Draughtsman mechanical, according to the Industrial training institutes set up by the Government of India. In the year 1977, the institute got its recognition and affiliation to the National Council for Vocational Training (NCVT), Government of India. New trades like refrigeration & air conditioning mechanic, mechanic radio & television (which was subsequently converted to electronics mechanic) & electrician were introduced and the institution has now become the most sought after amongst the Industrial Training Institutes. Many public and private sector industries depute their employees for apprentice training and regular campus interviews are held for selection of skilled personnel. The trust has provided an excellent secured atmosphere in the campus located on a sprawling 3 acres land with spacious classrooms, well-equipped workshops, laboratories and computer lab etc.

Courses offered
The college offers undergraduate courses in 6 streams and postgraduate courses in 2 streams of Engineering.

Undergraduate courses and intake via donation

Postgraduate programmes and intake

The college is running programmes such as Manufacturing Science and Engineering in the department of Mechanical Engineering and Power System Engineering in the department of Electrical and Electronics Engg., along with M.Sc., Engg., (by Research) and Doctoral programmes in both departments.

References

External links
College website

Cet Karnataka
Detailed college Profile

Engineering colleges in Karnataka
Universities and colleges in Ramanagara district
Affiliates of Visvesvaraya Technological University
Educational institutions established in 1980